Heidemarie Fischer (née Baschurow) (19 October 1944 – 4 September 2022) was a German politician. A member of the Social Democratic Party of Germany, she served in the Abgeordnetenhaus of Berlin from 1986 to 1990 and again from 1995 to 2006.

Fischer died in Berlin on 4 September 2022, at the age of 77.

References

1944 births
2022 deaths
20th-century German women politicians
21st-century German women politicians
Social Democratic Party of Germany politicians
Members of the Abgeordnetenhaus of Berlin
Politicians from Berlin